Bruno Reboli Meneghel (born 3 June 1987 in Vitória, Espírito Santo.), or simply Bruno Meneghel, is a Brazilian football striker.

Career 
Bruno Meneghel began his career in the youth from Vasco and was promoted to the first team in 2005.

Before joining Bahia on 7 May 2008, he defended Bréscia, where he scored eight goals in nine Campeonato Carioca Second Level games. He joined Resende on 29 December 2008 for the 2009 season. Goiás signed striker from Resende on 15 April 2009.

References

External links
 

 CBF  
 
 Bruno Meneghel interview 
 websoccerclub 

1987 births
Living people
Brazilian footballers
Campeonato Brasileiro Série A players
CR Vasco da Gama players
Esporte Clube Bahia players
Resende Futebol Clube players
Clube Náutico Capibaribe players
Criciúma Esporte Clube players
América Futebol Clube (MG) players
Qingdao Hainiu F.C. (1990) players
Dalian Professional F.C. players
Cerezo Osaka players
Changchun Yatai F.C. players
Albirex Niigata players
Yokohama FC players
Brazilian expatriate footballers
Expatriate footballers in China
Brazilian expatriate sportspeople in China
Expatriate footballers in Japan
Brazilian expatriate sportspeople in Japan
Brazilian people of German descent
Chinese Super League players
China League One players
J2 League players
Association football forwards
21st-century Brazilian people